Fusitheca was a genus of land plant with branching axes. It is known from charcoalified Early Devonian deposits, its type locality being the Brown Clee Hill lagerstätten.
Its spores form smooth-walled, unfused, naked dyads.  Its axis comprises length-parallel filaments, and their dichotomies are T-shaped, with the branches bending to continue upwards.

References 

Silurian plants
Early Devonian plants
Prehistoric plant genera